Mirmon Ayesha (fl. 1863), was an Afghan royal consort. She was married to Sher Ali Khan (r. 1863–1879). She hailed from Lal Pur Afghanistan of the Momand tribe.

She was one of the many wives of the king. It was the custom of the monarch to have four official wives and a large number of unofficial wives as well as slave concubines in the harem of the royal Palace complex in Kabul. She was however his favorite wife, and it was said that he loved her 'more than matrimony'. 

She was known for her great influence over her spouse, and has been referred to as the perhaps most politically influential royal wife in Afghanistan royal history prior to Soraya Tarzi. It was known that she had influence not only over the affairs of the royal harem and court but over the appointments of political offices as well, and it was said that after the selection or nomination of a successor, Afghanistan's first cabinet was formed in her presence inside the harem.

References 

 M. Saed: Women in Afghanistan history
 Ismati, Masoma. ( 1987), The position and role of Afghan women ·in Afghan society, from the late 18th to the 19th century; Kabul

Afghan royal consorts
19th-century Afghan people
Barakzai dynasty